Alexandra Wood may refer to:

Alexandra Wood (violinist) (born 1977), British violinist
Alexandra Wood (dramatist), British dramatist